The 2011 World Under-17 Hockey Challenge was an ice hockey tournament held in Winnipeg and Portage la Prairie, Manitoba, Canada between December 29, 2010 and January 4, 2011. The World Under-17 Hockey Challenge is held by Hockey Canada annually to showcase young hockey talent from across Canada and other strong hockey countries.  The primary venues used for the tournament were the MTS Iceplex in Winnipeg and the PCU Centre in Portage la Prairie. The semi-final and medal games were played at the MTS Centre.  Team Ontario captured the gold medal with a 5-3 victory over Team USA in front of a record crowd of 12,060 at the MTS Centre on January 4.  Team Pacific (British Columbia & Alberta) claimed the bronze medal.

Challenge results

Preliminary round

Group A

Results

Group B

Results

Final round

* Decided in overtime.

Semifinals

9th place game

7th place game

5th place game

Bronze medal game

Gold medal game

Scoring leaders

Goaltending leaders
(Minimum 60 minutes played)

Final standings

Tournament All-Star Team
Goaltender:  Ontario Daniel Altshuller
Defencemen:  Seth Jones,  West Derrick Pouliot
Forwards:  Ontario Andreas Athanasiou,  Nicolas Kerdiles,  Pacific Hunter Shinkaruk

See also
World U-17 Hockey Challenge
2011 IIHF World U18 Championships
2011 World Junior Ice Hockey Championships

References

External links

U-17
U-17
U-17
U-17
U-17
ice hockey
World U-17 Hockey Challenge
Sport in Portage la Prairie
World U-17 Hockey
World U-17 2011
International ice hockey competitions hosted by Canada